Martinović (Serbian Cyrillic: Mартиновић) is a patronymic surname meaning 'son of Martin', and is a common surname in Bosnia and Herzegovina, Croatia, Montenegro and Serbia. Its Hungarian form is Martinovics.

It is also the surname of a Montenegrin aristocratic dynasty, the Martinovitch-Orlovitch, named after its dynastic founder, Martin Orlović, during the former days of the royal state, as well as one of the clans of Montenegro. To this day the tradition of the burning of the Badnjak (oak branch) outside the Cetinje Monastery in celebration of Orthodox Christmas is performed by a member of the Martinovići.

Notable people with the surname include:
 Aleksandar Martinović, Serbian lawyer and politician
 Alexandre Martinović, French-born Montenegrin football player
 Anica Martinović, married Kovač, Croatian model
 Branislav Martinović, Serbian wrestler
 Danijela Martinović, Croatian singer 
 Darko Martinović, Bosnian-Herzegovinian handball player
 Dejan Martinović, Bosnian-Herzegovinian and Croatian football player
 Dino Martinović, Croatian-born Slovenian football player
 Dominik Martinović, German-born Croatian football player
 Dušan Martinović, Serbian football player
 Đorđe Martinović, Serbian farmer from Kosovo
 Ignác Martinovics, Hungarian scholar and secret agent of Serbian or Albanian descent
 Ilija Martinović, Montenegrin football player
 Jovo Martinović, Montenegrin journalist
 Marija Martinović, now Šestak, Serbian-born Slovenian athlete
 Maša Martinović, now Vidić, Croatian karate athlete
 Milan Martinović, Serbian football player
 Mitar Martinović, Montenegrin army officer
 Nada Martinović, Serbian-American music pedagogue
 Novak Martinović, Serbian football player
 Ratimir Martinović, Montenegrin pianist
 Sandra Martinović, Bosnian-Herzegovinian tennis player
 Saša Martinović (ice hockey player), German-born Croatian ice hockey player
 Saša Martinović (chess player), Croatian chess player
 Savo Martinović, Serbian satirist
 Siniša Martinović, Croatian ice hockey player
 Slobodan Martinović, Serbian chess player
 Snježana Martinović, Bosnian-Herzegovinian actress
 Tamara Martinović, Serbian ballet dancer
 Uroš Martinović, Serbian rugby player
 Vesna Martinović
 Vladimir Martinović, Serbian football player
 Vlasti Martinovic, Romanian football player
 Vuk Martinović, Montenegrin football player

See also
 Martinovich
 Martinić

Croatian surnames
Montenegrin surnames
Serbian surnames
Patronymic surnames
Surnames from given names